DishTV India (stylised as dishtv) is an Indian satellite television provider based in Noida, Uttar Pradesh with Yes Bank as its biggest stakeholder. DishTV was launched by the Zee Group on 2 October 2003. It ranked #437 and #5 on the list of media companies in Fortune India 500 roster of India's largest corporations in 2011. Dish TV was also voted India's most trusted DTH brand according to the Brand Trust Report 2014, a study conducted by Trust Research Advisory. On 22 March 2018, Dish TV completed a merger with Videocon d2h, creating the largest DTH provider in India at the time of merger.

History
DishTV launched the first DTH service in India on 2 October 2003. The company decided not to compete against entrenched cable operators in metros and urban areas, and instead focused on providing services to rural areas and regions not serviced by cable television. Jawahar Goel, who led the launch, recalled 10 years later, "We hardly had four transponders and could offer only 48 channels, compared to analog cable that was giving 60 and was much cheaper. And, STAR refused to give its channels. So, we decided to go slow and concentrate in cable-dry and cable-frustrated markets, rather than cable-rich markets and build the market step by step." Dish TV acquired 350,000 subscribers within 2 years of the launch.

Following bitter legal proceedings between STAR and Zee, in 2007, the two companies called a truce and began offering their channels on each other's services. This decision and Dish TV's acquisition of more transponders enabled them to offer 150 channels on their service, more than any other DTH service in India at the time.

Merger with Videocon d2h 
On 11 November 2016, the Board of Directors of Dish TV and Videocon d2h agreed to an all-stock merger of their DTH operations.

The merger was approved by the Competition Commission of India (CCI) on 10 May 2017, and by the National Company Law Tribunal on 27 July 2017. The merger faced uncertainty in January 2018, when Dish TV announced that it was re-evaluating the merger after some of the Videocon Group's lenders petitioned the National Company Law Tribunal to open insolvency proceedings against the company. In February 2018, Dish TV announced that it intended to go through with the merger.

As of December 31, 2017, d2h had a market share of 19% among the pay DTH operators.

The amalgamation was officially completed on 22 March 2018. The merger made the new combined entity the largest DTH provider in India with 17.7 million active subscribers. Dish TV and Videocon d2h reported separate revenue numbers in FY2017. The company retained the name of DishTV India Limited after the merger.

Fall of promoters' shareholding 
In May 2021, it was disclosed that promoters' shareholding in Dish TV has fallen to just 5.67%. It was also told that Yes Bank has become largest shareholder of the company.

Zing Digital
Zing Digital is a subsidiary of Dish TV India launched in January 2015 to provide access to South India's regional channel. The service currently operates in Kerala, West Bengal and Odisha.

See also
 Direct-to-home television in India
 Fortune India 500

References

External links
 Dish TV

Indian direct broadcast satellite services
Direct broadcast satellite services
Television networks in India
Indian brands
Companies based in Noida
Indian companies established in 2003
Telecommunications companies established in 2003
Mass media companies established in 2003
2003 establishments in Uttar Pradesh
Companies listed on the National Stock Exchange of India
Companies listed on the Bombay Stock Exchange